Dominic Roussel (born February 22, 1970) is a Canadian former professional ice hockey goaltender who played eight seasons in the National Hockey League (NHL) for the Philadelphia Flyers, Winnipeg Jets, Mighty Ducks of Anaheim and Edmonton Oilers between 1991 and 2001. He also played in the minor American Hockey League.

Playing career
As a youth, Roussel played in the 1983 Quebec International Pee-Wee Hockey Tournament with a minor ice hockey team from Laval, Quebec.

Roussel was selected in the third round of the 1988 NHL Entry Draft, 63rd overall, by the Philadelphia Flyers and made his NHL debut during the 1991–92 season. He would remain with the Flyers organization for another three seasons, serving as the Flyers' starting goalie in the 1993–94 season. He was traded to the Winnipeg Jets in 1996, but soon re-signed with the Flyers.

Roussel had a brief spell in Germany's Deutsche Eishockey Liga with the Starbulls Rosenheim in the 1997–98 season. His NHL rights were traded to the Nashville Predators and then the Mighty Ducks of Anaheim. After two and half seasons with the Mighty Ducks, he was claimed off waivers by the Edmonton Oilers to be their back up.

He played five games in the Quebec Semi-Pro Hockey League with the Lasalle Rapides before returning to Germany, signing with the Frankfurt Lions before retiring in 2003.

He is now a private goalie trainer through his company, Succès hockey Dominic Roussel.

Transactions
February 27, 1996: Philadelphia trades Roussel for Tim Cheveldae and a 3rd round draft pick
June 26, 1998: Philadelphia trades Roussel and Jeff Staples to Nashville for a 7th round draft pick (Cam Ondrik)
October 5, 1998: Nashville trades Roussel to Anaheim for Marc Moro and Chris Mason

Career statistics

Regular season and playoffs

References

External links
Dominic Roussel website
 

1970 births
Living people
Canadian expatriate ice hockey players in Germany
Canadian ice hockey goaltenders
Edmonton Oilers players
Frankfurt Lions players
Hershey Bears players
Mighty Ducks of Anaheim players
Philadelphia Flyers draft picks
Philadelphia Flyers players
Philadelphia Phantoms players
Shawinigan Cataractes players
Starbulls Rosenheim players
Trois-Rivières Draveurs players
Winnipeg Jets (1979–1996) players
Ice hockey people from Gatineau